Robert Alexander Allan, Baron Allan of Kilmahew,  (11 July 1914 – 4 April 1979) was a British Conservative politician.

Allan was educated at Harrow School, Clare College, Cambridge and Yale University. He served in the Royal Naval Volunteer Reserve during World War II and was appointed an officer of the Order of the British Empire (OBE) in 1942, a Companion of the Distinguished Service Order (DSO) in 1944, and was awarded the French Croix de guerre.

Allan was Member of Parliament (MP) for Paddington South between 1951 and 1966. In 1958 and 1959, he was also Financial Secretary to the Admiralty.

On 16 July 1973, he was created a life peer as Baron Allan of Kilmahew, of Cardross in the County of Dunbartonshire.

His son Sir Alex Allan is a former senior civil servant, who served as chairman of the Joint Intelligence Committee.

References

External links
 

1914 births
1979 deaths
Conservative Party (UK) MPs for English constituencies
Allan of Kilmahew
UK MPs 1951–1955
UK MPs 1955–1959
UK MPs 1959–1964
UK MPs 1964–1966
People educated at Sandroyd School
Alumni of Clare College, Cambridge
UK MPs who were granted peerages
Companions of the Distinguished Service Order
Royal Naval Volunteer Reserve personnel of World War II
Commandeurs of the Légion d'honneur
Recipients of the Croix de Guerre 1939–1945 (France)
Lords of the Admiralty
Parliamentary Private Secretaries to the Prime Minister
Ministers in the Macmillan and Douglas-Home governments, 1957–1964
Life peers created by Elizabeth II